Mingo is an unincorporated community in Thomas County, Kansas, United States  It is located approximately  southeast of Colby, then west of I-70 exit 62 via a rural road. It is primarily the site of a large granary operation; there is also a church, two large farms and, near the highway, a free-standing self-service gasoline pump row; and no other businesses or services.  There are also a dozen or so homes.

History
Mingo had a post office from 1888 until 1940; the post office was designated "Thurford" until 1894.  The oldest active geocache in the world is near Mingo.

Education
The community is served by Colby USD 315 public school district.

References

Further reading

External links
 Thomas County maps: Current, Historic, KDOT

Unincorporated communities in Thomas County, Kansas
Unincorporated communities in Kansas